Route 965, or Highway 965, may refer to:

Canada
  in Saskatchewan

India
  in Maharashtra

United States
  in Iowa
  in Louisiana
  in Maryland
  in Pennsylvania
  in Puerto Rico